The Premier Service is a passenger train service operated by Transport for Wales Rail between Holyhead and Cardiff in Wales.

History
On 15 December 2008, the Premier Service commenced operating between Holyhead and Cardiff Central. Originally named Y Gerallt Gymro (Gerald of Wales), it was funded by the Welsh Government as a premium service to connect North and South Wales. Grand Central and Wrexham & Shropshire expressed an interest in operating the service; however, the contract was awarded to Wales & Borders franchise holder Arriva Trains Wales.

Four Class 57s (57313-57316) were sublet from Virgin Trains West Coast to operate in top and tail formation, with one Mark 3 and three Mark 2 carriages. By February 2009, the service was being operated by a single Class 57.

In March 2012, the Class 57s were replaced by DB Schenker Class 67s. The Mark 2 carriages were replaced with Mark 3s at the same time. It originally ran via Crewe but, from September 2012, it was rerouted via Wrexham General after a Driving Van Trailer was added; this allowed the train to change direction at Chester.

In October 2018, operation of the Premier Service passed with the Wales & Borders franchise to KeolisAmey Wales. In March 2020, the service was suspended due to the COVID-19 pandemic with the Mark 3s withdrawn. It resumed in June 2021 with Class 67 hauled Mark 4s and, as of August 2021, 3 trains in each direction now operate five days a week.

Services
The Premier Service departs Holyhead at 05:33, 11:33 and 16:36 five days a week; they leave Cardiff Central at 06:45, 11:22 and 17:16. It features first-class accommodation and a dining car with a travelling chef. First class customers have the option of purchasing a breakfast, lunch or dinner, cooked to order, by the on-board chef. Normal standard-class fares are valid on the train. This is the only Transport for Wales service to offer first-class accommodation.

References

External links

Named passenger trains of the United Kingdom
Railway services introduced in 2008
2008 establishments in the United Kingdom